Bishop Paweł Socha, C.M. (born 10 January 1935) is a Polish Roman Catholic prelate, who served as an Auxiliary bishop of the Roman Catholic Diocese of Zielona Góra-Gorzów and the Titular Bishop of Thunigaba since 20 November 1973 until his retirement on 16 January 2012.

Life
Bishop Socha was born in the Roman Catholic family in a present day Masovian Voivodeship. After graduation of the school education, joined the Congregation of the Mission (Vincentian Fathers) in 1951; he made a solemn profession on December 8, 1956, and was ordained as priest on May 22, 1958, after graduation of the Major Vincentians Theological Seminary in Kraków, Poland and a Fundamental Theology at the Catholic University of Lublin, Poland.

After his ordination he was engaged in the pastoral and missionary work and from 1962 he was a professor at the Major Theological Seminary in Gościkowo-Paradyż. Simultaneously he continued to study in the Catholic University of Lublin with obtaining a Doctor of Theology degree in 1969. Also from 1975 until 1978, as a bishop, he was a rector the same Major Theological Seminary.

On November 20, 1973, he was appointed by the Pope Paul VI as the Auxiliary Bishop of the Roman Catholic Diocese of Gorzów and Titular Bishop of Thunigaba. On December 26, 1973, he was consecrated as bishop by Cardinal Karol Wojtyła, future St. Pope John Paul II, and other prelates of the Roman Catholic Church.

In 1974 Bishop Socha was appointed as a Vicar General of the same diocese (it was renamed as the Diocese of Zielona Góra-Gorzów on March 25, 1992), and fulfilled this duty until his retirement on January 16, 2012.

References

1935 births
Living people
People from Radom County
John Paul II Catholic University of Lublin alumni
20th-century Roman Catholic bishops in Poland
21st-century Roman Catholic bishops in Poland
Vincentian bishops